Carlos Mayans (born July 8, 1948) became mayor of the city of Wichita, Kansas in April 2003.  He was born in Havana, Cuba in 1948 and emigrated to the United States through the  Operation Peter Pan shortly after the Cuban Revolution of 1959.  In addition to serving as mayor, Mayans also served as a Republican representative for Wichita's 100th district in the Kansas House of Representatives for five terms and ran an insurance agency before becoming mayor. He lost a re-election bid for mayor to Carl Brewer by 61% to 37% in 2007.

References

1948 births
Living people
Republican Party members of the Kansas House of Representatives
American politicians of Cuban descent
Hispanic and Latino American mayors
Hispanic and Latino American state legislators
Mayors of Wichita, Kansas
20th-century American politicians
21st-century American politicians